The 2003–04 season was the 102nd season in the history of Norwich City, and the club's ninth consecutive season competing in the Football League First Division.

Norwich gained promotion to the FA Premier League as league champions with 94 points, finishing eight points ahead of runners-up West Bromwich Albion.

Kit
Norwich maintained their kit manufacturing deal with Xara, who produced a new kit for the next two seasons.

Players

First-team squad
Squad at end of season

Left club during season

Statistics

Appearances, goals and cards
(Substitute appearances in brackets)

* indicates number taken from departed player

Competitions

League

August

September

October

November

December

January

February

March

April

May

FA Cup

League Cup

Final league table

Notes

References

Norwich City F.C. seasons
Norwich City